The church of Saint Agnes Outside the Walls is a titulus church, minor basilica in Rome, on a site sloping down from the Via Nomentana, which runs north-east out of the city, still under its ancient name.  What are said to be the remains of Saint Agnes are below the high altar. The church is built over the Catacombs of Saint Agnes, where the saint was originally buried, and which may still be visited from the church. A large basilica with the same name was built nearby in the 4th century and its ruins can be seen near Santa Costanza, in the same site. The existing church was built by Pope Honorius I in the 7th century, and largely retains its original structure, despite many changes to the decoration. In particular the mosaic in the apse of Agnes, Honorius, and another Pope is largely in its original condition.  The current Cardinal Priest of the Titulus S. Agnetis Extra moenia is Camillo Ruini.

History

A very large basilica was built some metres from the present church in the 4th century, to which was attached the large private mausoleum for Constantina, the daughter of Constantine I.  The mausoleum was later converted into a church, which survives and is now known as Santa Costanza (she was venerated as a saint, even though she was not one officially). It contains very important 4th century mosaics, especially large areas of ceiling in a secular style, but also two small apse mosaics, one including an early depiction of Jesus in what has become the standard style of long fair hair and a halo.

The large basilica decayed during the decline of Rome, and was replaced in the 7th century by the present much smaller church, commissioned by Pope Honorius I. The lower part of the walls from about half of one side of the Constantinian basilica, and its apse, can still be seen. The new church was over what was believed to be Agnes's grave. The floor level of the 7th-century church is some two metres above the level of the catacomb floor, and the public street entrances are at the level of the 2nd floor gallery. A long wide internal set of steps, lined with inscriptions from the catacombs and other ancient buildings set into the walls, leads down from the street level to the floor level of the church.  The apse mosaic from Honorius's time is still present, and less affected by restoration than most mosaics of this date. On a gold ground, a central standing figure of Agnes in the costume of a Byzantine empress is flanked by Honorius, offering a model of the building, and another pope, whose identity is uncertain. The church was also built with a separate upper gallery for women (matronaeum), similar to that of San Lorenzo fuori le mura. Saint Emerentiana was also buried here.

The catacombs are on three levels, dating from the 2nd to the 5th centuries; part of the highest level dating to the 2nd century can be visited by a guided tour. Though no paintings remain in place, there are a number of inscriptions and engraved images of interest. Many more inscriptions line the large staircase leading from the main convent above to the church.

It is in this church that on the feast day of St. Agnes (January 21), two lambs are specially blessed, usually by the pope after a pontifical high Mass; their wool is later woven into pallia, ceremonial neck-stoles sent by the popes to newly elevated Metropolitan-archbishops to symbolise their union with the papacy.

The church was assigned to the Canons Regular of the Lateran by Pope Innocent VIII in 1489; and they continued to serve it after Pope Clement XI made it a parish church in 1708. It is the headquarters of the primaria sodality of the Children of Mary, founded here in 1864.

In legend and literature
The church is the topic of Canadian author and anthropologist Margaret Visser's book The Geometry of Love, published in 2000, which describes it in exhaustive detail and discusses aspects of history, theology, architecture, symbolism and the emotional and aesthetic effects of visiting the church.

List of Cardinal Priests
The Church of S. Agnese fuori le mura was established as a titular church for a Cardinal Priest on 5 October 1654 by Pope Innocent X:
  (5 October 1654 – 1 April 1658)
 Girolamo Farnese (6 May 1658 – 18 February 1668)
 Vitaliano Visconti (18 March 1669 – 7 October 1671)
 Federico Borromeo (iuniore) (8 August 1672 – 18 February 1673)
 Toussaint de Forbin-Janson (10 July 1690 – 28 September 1693)
 Giambattista Spinola (20 February 1696 – 7 April 1698)
 Rannuzio Pallavicino (25 June 1706 – 30 June 1712)
 Giorgio Spínola (20 January 1721 – 15 December 1734)
 Serafino Cenci (27 June 1735 – 24 June 1740)
 Filippo Maria De Monti (23 September 1743 – 10 April 1747)
 Frédéric Jérôme de La Rochefoucauld (15 May 1747 – 29 April 1757)
 Etienne-René Potier de Gesvres (2 August 1758 – 24 July 1774)
 Luigi Valenti Gonzaga (30 March 1778 – 29 November 1790)
 Giuseppe Spina (24 May 1802 – 21 February 1820)
 Dionisio Bardaxí y Azara (27 September 1822 – 3 December 1826)
 Ignazio Nasalli-Ratti (17 September 1827 – 2 December 1831)
 Filippo Giudice Caracciolo (30 September 1833 – 29 January 1844)
 Hugues-Robert-Jean-Charles de la Tour d’Auvergne-Lauraquais (16 April 1846 – 20 July 1851)
 Girolamo D’Andrea in commendam (18 March 1852 – 14 May 1868)
 Lorenzo Barili (24 September 1868 – 8 March 1875)
 Pietro Giannelli (31 March 1875 – 5 November 1881)
 Charles-Martial Allemand-Lavigerie (3 July 1882 – 25 November 1892)
 Georg von Kopp (19 January 1893 – 4 March 1914)
 Károly Hornig (28 May 1914 – 9 February 1917)
 Adolf Bertram (18 December 1919 – 6 July 1945)
 Samuel Alphonse Stritch (22 February 1946 – 26 May 1958)
 Carlo Confalonieri (18 December 1958 – 15 March 1972)
 Louis-Jean Guyot (5 March 1973 – 1 August 1988)
 Camillo Ruini (28 June 1991 – present)

References

Additional sources 
 Marina Magnani Cianetti and Carlo Pavolini, La Basilica costantiniana di Sant'Agnese: lavori archeologici e di restauro (Milano: Electa, 2004).

 Friedrich Wilhelm Deichmann, S. Agnese Fuori le Mura und die byzantinische Frage in der frühchristlichen Architektur Roms (Leipzig 1941).
 Carlo Cecchelli, S. Agnese fuori le mura e S. Costanza (Roma, Casa Editrice  1924) [Le chiese di Roma illustrate, no. 10].

External links
 Parish website

Basilica churches in Rome
Titular churches
7th-century churches in Italy
Roman Catholic churches in Rome
Rome Q. XVII Trieste